Keelung Nuannuan pothole is a pothole or kettle hole in the exposed bed of the Keelung River at Nuannuan District, Keelung City in Taiwan. A pothole is a circular depression on the river bed carved out of solid rock. It is formed by a kind of drilling action as pebbles are caught in eddy currents and whisked around within a small natural crack or hollow. As time passes, the drilling action enlarges the hollow to form a pothole. Potholes are commonly found below waterfalls or rapids where hydraulic action is a significant process.

Geological interest
These naturally occurring potholes are of great interest to geologists, as they're quite uncommon. The best-known kettle holes in Taiwan are a mass of indents in the exposed bed of the Keelung River at the town of Nuannuan, near Keelung City, although part of their fame is surely due to their lying right beside a busy road. Keelung River near Nuannuan has a narrower river channel and thus faster flowing water and turbulents which results in the formation of potholes. Riverbed potholes normally take many hundreds years to form and it is an extremely important geological feature. The formation phenomena provokes wide research interests in fluid dynamics, landscape, geology, climate, hydrological and rock studies. Its rarity also serve as an invaluable educational resource for everybody.

Guo-Gang Community
There are around 4400 people living in Nuannuan district forming a Guo-Gang Community. The people of Guo-Gang community plays an important part in protecting the potholes in Nuannuan. These potholes were badly damaged when the nearby highways were built 12 years ago. The highways are due for servicing in 2012, and therefore, the Guo-Gang community has been doing many activities hoping to raise government's awareness of how valuable these potholes are to hope reduce the overall damage.

Picture gallery

References 

Karst caves
Geology of Taiwan
Geography of Keelung